The Anchimayen (in the Mapudungun language, also spelled "Anchimallén" or "Anchimalguén" in Spanish) is a mythical creature in Mapuche mythology. Anchimayens are described as little creatures that take the form of small children, and can transform into fireball flying spheres that emit bright light. They are the servants of a kalku (a type of Mapuche sorcerer), and are created from the corpses of children.

Anchimayens are sometimes confused with Kueyen (the Mapuche lunar goddess), because she also produces a bright light.

See also
 Ball lightning
 Energy being
 Tupilaq
 Tikoloshe

References 

 Louis C. Faron. The Mapuche Indians of Chile. Case studies in cultural anthropology. Holt, Rinehart and Winston, 1968.

Mapuche legendary creatures
Corporeal undead
Latin American folklore